Reza Naseri  (born 16 September 1975) is an Iranian retired futsal player and current coach. He has also won five AFC Futsal Championships with Iran.

Honors

Country 
 AFC Futsal Championship
 Champions (5): 2001 - 2002 - 2003 - 2004 - 2005
 Asian Indoor Games
 Champion (1): 2005

Club 
 Iranian Futsal Super League
 Champion  (1): 2007–08 (Tam Iran Khodro)
 Runner-Up (2): 2005–06 (Tam Iran Khodro)  - 2009–10 (Shahid Mansouri)

Individual 
 Best player:
 Best futsal goalkeeper of the Iran in 2007-08.
Member of Iran national U-17 Football and Futsal (Captain)
Member of Iran national Youth Team Football
Member of Iran Army National Team (Football)
Member of Esteglal F.C. in Asia Champion Cup
Head coach of Tasisat-e-Daryaee Futsal Club
Technical Manager of asisat-e-Daryaee Futsal Club in Asia Championship
CEO of Arash Club
Manager of Isargaran-e-Shohada Club
Sport Expert and TV host in many Sport programs
Member of Team-e-IranKhodra Club in Club World Cup

References

External links 
 



1975 births
Living people
Iranian footballers
Iranian men's futsal players
Futsal goalkeepers
Esteghlal F.C. players
Malavan players
Esteghlal FSC players
Persepolis FSC players
Tam Iran Khodro FSC players
Shahid Mansouri FSC players
Foolad Mahan FSC players
Shahrdari Saveh FSC players
Association football goalkeepers